Varnița is a village in the Anenii Noi District, Moldova, located near Bender (Tighina). It is also considered a suburb of Bender. After the 1992 War of Transnistria, Varnița remained controlled by the government of the Republic of Moldova, while the city of Bender is controlled by the authorities of Transnistria.

History
The first mention of the village comes from the company of Sultan Suleiman the Magnificent in a firman directed to Hasan, a bey of Akkerman and the Sandžak. It mentions that according to information provided by Moldovan voivode Alexander Lăpuşneanu, bandits who had committed murders and robberies had found shelter in Varniţa or Varnigea near Bender. There is a hypothesis according to which the town was established immediately after the creation of Bender in 1538.

The Second Stockholm
After losing the battle of Poltava, Swedish King Charles XII, lived in the village between 1709-1713. The king set up a military camp in here which was called the Second Stockholm. The settlement included his Cossack and Moldavian allies, notably among whom was Ivan Mazepa, who died in Varniţa. In 1925, at the request of the Swedish authorities, a memorial obelisk was erected here. A separate monument commemorates the figure of Mazepa.

In 2016, the remains of the palace of Charles XII were found in the village

Territorial dispute between Moldova and Transnistria
The leaders of Transnistria claim Varnița as being part of the Pridnestrovian Moldavian Republic, but the attempts of Transnistrian authorities to take control of the village have failed to date. This conflict likely stems from Varnița being a port on the Dniester River, and began in 2006..

In 2006, the parties announced their willingness to settle the dispute in court, and the authorities in Transnistria announced that until the verdict was handed down, the control of port infrastructure should be exercised by the mainly Russian soldiers stationed in Transnistria since 1992. After the soldiers entered Varniţa, the US Embassy in Chisinau became interested in the case, calling for the return of the port of Moldova. The European Union also called on both sides to calm and de-escalate the conflict. Finally, a Moldovan court stated that the port was the property of local authorities. The incident around the port was artificially blown up by both parties, both possessing a key interest in keeping international organizations involved in the conflict over Transnistria. In 2013, another border incident occurred in the village, when residents destroyed border checkpoints built by Transnistria in response to the Moldovan announcement of erecting such points in the security zone. That same year, the President of Transnistria, Evgeni Shevchuk, by decree unilaterally announced the extension of the Transnistria borders to include Varniţa.

Demographics
According to the 2004 Moldovan Census, there were 4,210 inhabitants, 3,390 of which were ethnic Moldovans, 228 Ukrainians, 454 Russians, 15 Gagauzes, 35 Bulgarians, 1 Jew, 1 Pole, 50 Gypsies, and 36 other/undeclared.

Notable people
 

Iurie Apostolachi (born 1960), politician

References

External links
 Interview with Tudor Serbov, mayor of Varnița
 

Communes of Anenii Noi District
Populated places on the Dniester
Bendersky Uyezd